ʿAlī ibn ʿĪsā al-Asṭurlābī (fl. 832) was a 9th century Arab geographer and astronomer. He wrote a treatise on the astrolabe and was an opponent of astrology. During the reign of al-Ma'mun, and together with Khālid ibn ʿAbd al‐Malik al‐Marwarrūdhī, he participated in an expedition to the Plain of Sinjar to measure the length of a degree.

References

Sources

Further reading
 ʿAlī ibn ʿĪsā al-Asṭurlābī, Kitāb al-ʿamal bi-l-asṭurlāb , ed. by P. Louis Cheikho : "'Kitāb al-ʿamal bi-l-asṭurlāb li-ʿAlī ibn ʿĪsā", in: al-Mashriq 16 (1913), pp. 29–46; transl. German by Carl Schoy, "ʿAlī ibn ʿĪsā, Das Astrolab und sein Gebrauch", in: Isis 9 (1927), pp. 239–254.

Geographers from the Abbasid Caliphate
Astronomers from the Abbasid Caliphate
9th-century astronomers
9th-century people from the Abbasid Caliphate
9th-century Arabs
Astronomers of the medieval Islamic world